Charles B. Woram (March 29, 1845 – November 1, 1897) was a Union Navy sailor in the American Civil War and a recipient of the U.S. military's highest decoration, the Medal of Honor, for his actions at the Battle of Mobile Bay.

Born on March 29, 1845, in New York City, Woram was still living in the state of New York when he joined the Navy. At the Battle of Mobile Bay on August 5, 1864, he showed "cool courage" while carrying orders for the ship's executive officer. For this action, he was awarded the Medal of Honor four months later, on December 31, 1864.

Woram's official Medal of Honor citation reads:
Served on board the U.S.S. Oneida in the engagement at Mobile Bay, 5 August 1864. Acting as an aid to the executive officer, Woram carried orders intelligently and correctly, distinguishing himself by his cool courage throughout the battle which resulted in the capture of the rebel ram Tennessee and the damaging of Fort Morgan.

Woram died on November 1, 1897, at age 52 and was buried in the Bronx.

References

External links 
 

1845 births
1897 deaths
Military personnel from New York City
People of New York (state) in the American Civil War
Union Navy sailors
United States Navy Medal of Honor recipients
American Civil War recipients of the Medal of Honor